Tottonophyidae is a family of marine hydrozoans in the order Siphonophorae. It consists of one genus, Tottonophyes, which consists one species, Tottonophyes enigmatica.  The type locality is Monterey Bay.

References

Monogeneric cnidarian families
Calycophorae